Hypopyra capensis is a moth of the family Erebidae first described by Gottlieb August Wilhelm Herrich-Schäffer in 1854. This moth species is commonly found in Africa, ranging from Sierra Leone, South Africa, Zaire, Eswatini to Zambia.

References

Moths of Africa
Moths described in 1854
Hypopyra